My Little Television V2 is a South Korean television program. The program is the second season of My Little Television. The raw live broadcasting of various channels would air via Twitch on Saturdays (KST) every two weeks, as well as via MBC on every Friday 21:50 (KST) starting March 29, 2019.

MBC announced that broadcast of the show on the TV channel would have its airtime changed to Mondays at 21:50 (KST) starting from October 21, 2019.

On January 2, 2020 MBC confirmed that the show would have its last live stream session on January 4, and the final episode on MBC would be aired on January 20.

Airtime

Cast

Former

Episodes

2019

 Live broadcast: March 15, 2019
 TV broadcast: March 29 & April 5, 2019
 The only live broadcast where the Control Room is seen; it will not be seen in subsequent live broadcasts

 Live broadcast: April 6, 2019
 TV broadcast: April 12 & 19, 2019

 Live broadcast: April 20, 2019
 TV broadcast: April 26 & May 3, 2019

 Live broadcast: May 4, 2019
 TV broadcast: May 10 & 17, 2019
 The number of broadcasting channels is reduced to four starting from this live broadcast.

 Live broadcast: May 18 & 19, 2019
 TV broadcast: May 24, 31 & June 7, 2019
 For this live broadcast, the four channels will be done in a relay.
 First overseas live broadcast in Seasons 1 & 2 combined

 Live broadcast: June 1, 2019
 TV broadcast: June 14 & 21, 2019

 Live broadcast: June 15, 2019
 TV broadcast: June 28 & July 5, 2019
 Song Ha-young (fromis 9) stood in for Ahn Yu-jin due to the latter attending IZ*ONE's Thailand concert.

 Live broadcast: June 29, 2019
 TV broadcast: July 12 & 19, 2019
 Song Ha-young (fromis 9) stood in for Ahn Yu-jin due to the latter attending IZ*ONE's Taiwan concert.
 This live broadcast is a Horror Special.

 Live broadcast: July 13, 2019
 TV broadcast: July 26 & August 2, 2019
 Song Ha-young (fromis 9) stood in for Ahn Yu-jin due to the latter attending IZ*ONE's Hong Kong concert.

 Live broadcast: July 27, 2019
 TV broadcast: August 9 & 16, 2019
 Song Ha-young (fromis 9) stood in for Ahn Yu-jin due to the latter attending IZ*ONE's Japan schedules.
 The entire house meant for all live broadcasts encountered a power outage, causing all live broadcasts to be cut off.

 Live broadcast: August 10, 2019
 TV broadcast: August 23 & 30, 2019
 Song Ha-young (fromis 9) stood in for Ahn Yu-jin due to the latter attending IZ*ONE's Japan schedules.
 This live broadcast is Vacance Special.

 Live broadcast: August 24, 2019
 TV broadcast: September 6 & 20, 2019
 Song Ha-young (fromis 9) stood in for Ahn Yu-jin due to the latter attending IZ*ONE's Japan schedules.
 No broadcast on September 13, 2019 due to Chuseok

 Live broadcast: September 21, 2019
 TV broadcast: September 27 & October 4, 2019

 Live broadcast: October 5, 2019
 TV broadcast: October 11 & 21, 2019
 Song Ha-young (fromis 9) stood in for Ahn Yu-jin due to the latter attending IZ*ONE's Japan schedules.
 This live broadcast is an Autumn Special; all 4 channels will do their live streams from outdoors.
 Kim Sohyi did her live stream from her restaurant, Kim Kocht, located in Vienna, Austria; her live stream began at 19:00 (KST) while the other 3 live streams began at 15:00 (KST).

 Live broadcast: October 19, 2019
 TV broadcast: October 28 & November 4, 2019
 Kim Jang-hoon did his live stream outdoors at Gangneung; his live stream began at 14:00 (KST) while the other 3 live streams began at 19:00 (KST).

 Live broadcast: November 1 & 2, 2019
 TV broadcast: November 11 & 18, 2019
 Kim Jang-hoon's live stream began at 13:00 (KST) on November 1 while the other 3 live streams began at 19:00 (KST) on November 2.
 IZ*ONE will be edited out from the MBC broadcast due to the Mnet vote manipulation investigation. Hence, Kim Sohyi would also not be seen in the MBC broadcast.

 Live broadcast: November 14 & 16, 2019
 TV broadcast: November 25 & December 2, 2019
 Ahn Yu-jin (IZ*ONE) will not appear on future broadcasts starting from this one due to the Mnet vote manipulation investigation.
 This live broadcast is a CSAT Special.
 Kim Jang-hoon's live stream began at 16:00 (KST) on November 14 (the day of CSAT) while the other 3 live streams began at 18:00 (KST) on November 16.

 Live broadcast: November 30, 2019
 TV broadcast: December 9 & 16, 2019
 Kim Gu-ra and Kim Jang-hoon's live stream began at 13:00 (KST) while the other 2 live streams began at 18:00 (KST).
 3 live broadcasts, instead of the usual 4, will be streamed beginning this series.

 Live broadcast: December 14, 2019
 TV broadcast: December 23, 2019 & January 6, 2020
 There is no MBC broadcast on December 30, 2019 due to the live broadcast of the 2019 MBC Drama Awards.

2020

 Live broadcast: January 4, 2020
 TV broadcast: January 13 & 20, 2020
 Final live stream session and episodes of the season
 Kim Gu-ra's live stream began at 14:00 (KST) while the other 2 live streams began at 18:00 (KST).

Ratings

2019

2020

Awards and nominations

References

Notes

External links
 
Official web broadcasting of live broadcasting 'channels' (requires Twitch for interacting with casts via chat)

Korean-language television shows
2010s South Korean television series
MBC TV original programming
South Korean variety television shows
South Korean reality television series